This is the list of the 13 members of the European Parliament for Denmark in the 2009 to 2014 session.


List

Party representation

Notes

Sources
List of Danish MEPs (in Danish)

Denmark
List
2009